Pentagramma bivittata is a species of delphacid planthopper in the family Delphacidae. It is found in the Caribbean, Central America, North America, and South America.

References

Further reading

 

Articles created by Qbugbot
Insects described in 1914
Asiracinae